Steinbach Bible College is an evangelical Anabaptist college located in Steinbach, Manitoba, Canada.

History
The college opened in 1936 as a training school for Mennonite Brethren and Evangelical Mennonite Brethren churches of Canada. In 1947, it was renamed Steinbach Bible Academy.

Affiliation
Steinbach Bible College holds accreditation from the Association for Biblical Higher Education.  SBC shares a campus with Steinbach Christian School. Steinbach Bible College is a denominational college supported by four conferences of churches: the Christian Mennonite Conference, the Evangelical Mennonite Conference, the Evangelical Mennonite Mission Conference, and the Mennonite Brethren Church of Manitoba which is part of the Canadian Conference of Mennonite Brethren Churches.

Programs
Steinbach Bible College offers several specializations:
 Ministry leadership, four-year bachelor of arts
 Biblical studies, options for three-year Bachelor of Arts, two-year associate of arts and one-year certificate
 Christian leadership (on campus or online), options for three-year Bachelor of Arts, two-year associate of arts and one-year certificate
 Marketplace, three-year bachelor of arts
 Pre-university, two-year associate of arts, one-year certificate

Additionally, the following programs are offered in partnership with other institutions:
 Bachelor of Social Work (in cooperation with Booth University College)
 TESOL Certificate (in cooperation with Providence University College)
 Pre-education (in cooperation with Canadian Mennonite University)

See also

List of evangelical seminaries and theological colleges

References

External links

Steinbach Bible College (Steinbach, Manitoba, Canada) at Global Anabaptist Mennonite Encyclopedia Online

Universities and colleges in Manitoba
Bible colleges
Universities and colleges affiliated with the Mennonite Church
Education in Steinbach, Manitoba
Educational institutions established in 1936
Mennonitism in Manitoba
1936 establishments in Manitoba
Mennonite schools in Canada